John Harley (29 September 1728 – 7 January 1788) was a British bishop.

Harley was the second son of Edward Harley, 3rd Earl of Oxford and Earl Mortimer. He was educated at Christ Church, Oxford, matriculating in 1747, graduating B.A. 1749, M.A. 1752, B.D. & D.D. 1778.

He was Archdeacon of Shropshire from 1760 to 1769 and then Archdeacon of Hereford from 1769 to 1787. He was Dean of Windsor, Registrar of the Order of the Garter and briefly, at the end of his life, the Bishop of Hereford before his death aged 59 in 1788.

His son Edward (by his wife Roach Vaughan, daughter of Gwynne Vaughan of Trebarry, Radnorshire) succeeded Harley's elder brother (Edward) as 5th Earl of Oxford.

References

1728 births
1788 deaths
Alumni of Christ Church, Oxford
Younger sons of earls
Archdeacons of Shropshire
Archdeacons of Hereford
Deans of Windsor
Bishops of Hereford
18th-century Church of England bishops
John
Registrars of the Order of the Garter